Gentleman was an English language literary magazine published in India from 1980 to 2001. Its founder-editor was Minhaz Merchant of the Sterling Publications, which sold this and other magazines to the Indian Express Group in 1987. It was edited and published by Sambit Bal and Rajib Sarkar.

Although the name of the magazine suggested a male-oriented magazine, Gentleman was anything but. They had to stick to the name due to corporate red-tape, and as a relief, used the tagline "Gentleman: Mindspace for Men".

Features
The magazine featured hardcore intellectual content, and was the only such magazine in its genre in India at that time. It went beyond its ambit of being a 'men's' magazine and published stories on current affairs, social issues, indepth journalism, crime, politics, food, music, movies, poetry, arts, fiction (including Comics) and personalities. Cover stories were highly acclaimed by the intellectual readers of the magazine. Most of the issues had a cover theme, for instance: "36 Most Under-rated Movies", and "Nine tomorrows" (a science fiction issue) and included articles from guest contributors.

Writers
Gentleman groomed a set of journalists and writers who found an outlet and an audience for stories that might have otherwise been considered offbeat or 'alternative' by the Indian Mainstream media. Some names associated with Gentleman magazine were:

Shashi Tharoor
 Ayesha Banerjee
Romola Butalia
 Anurag Mathur
 Atul Dev
David Davidar
 Harish C. Mehta
 Pradeep Sebastian (Entertainment Editor)
 Madhu Kishwar
 Shailaja Bajpai
Jaideep Varma
 Rohit Gupta
Farzana Versey
Varsha Bhosle
 Premnath Nair (Deputy Editor)
 Amit Varma
 Baiju Parthan
 Ajit Duara
 Niranjan Kaushik
 Jeet Thayil
 Leslie Mathew
 Dibyojyoti Haldar
 Prashant C Trikannad (Assistant Editor)
 Simran Shroff (Features Editor)

Illustrators
Sarnath Banerjee
George Mathen
Manjula Padmanabhan

References

1980 establishments in Tamil Nadu
2001 disestablishments in India
Defunct magazines published in India
Defunct literary magazines
English-language magazines published in India
Indian Express Limited
Literary magazines published in India
Monthly magazines published in India
Magazines established in 1980
Magazines disestablished in 2001